In Vento is a ballet by Mauro Bigonzetti, artistic director of Italy's Aterballetto dance company, to eponymous music of Bruno Moretti. It was commissioned as part of New York City Ballet's Diamond Project. The premiere took place May 4, 2006, at the David H. Koch Theater, Lincoln Center. In Vento is the second of three Bigonzetti / Moretti ballets commissioned by City Ballet, the others being Vespro and Oltremare.

Original cast
Maria Kowroski 
Benjamin Millepied 
Jason Fowler

Reviews  
"Dance Review - New York City Ballet Presents 'Il Vento' by Mauro Bigonzetti". New York Times.  John Rockwell, May 6, 2006. 
"Confronting The Collective". New York Sun. Joel Lobenthal, May 8, 2006.
"Jeweled Flash". Village Voice. Deborah Jowitt, May 9, 2006. 
"Diamond Project Appraised: Still Only Semiprecious". New York Observer. Robert Gottlieb, June 4, 2006.
"Dancing - Westward Ho!". The New Yorker. Joan Acocella, July 3, 2006. 
"Dance Review - Russian, American-Style, and a Loner on a Quest". New York Times. Jennifer Dunning, January 19, 2007.

Ballets by Mauro Bigonzetti
Ballets by Bruno Moretti
2006 ballet premieres
New York City Ballet Diamond Project
New York City Ballet repertory